Mary Ellen Callahan is an American attorney who serves as Chief of Staff to the Office of the Deputy Secretary at the U.S. Department of Homeland Security.  Callahan had previously served as Chief Privacy Officer of the Department of Homeland Security.

Early life and education 
Callahan grew up in a large family in Kennett Square, PA and graduated from Kennett High School. Callahan is a graduate of the University of Pittsburgh, she has been a Trustee for the University of Pittsburgh since 2009 and is currently serving as the Vice Chair exercising the duties of the Chair of the Board of Trustees. Callahan is also a graduate of  the University of Chicago Law School. Callahan was a student in Barack Obama's classes at the University of Chicago Law School and has spoken with the New York Times and the Washington Post about her impressions of him.

Career
Callahan began her legal career with an immediate focus on public service and consumer protection, and quickly became a leading expert and advocate in the (then) emerging area of data privacy and cybersecurity law.

Callahan started her practice at Hogan & Hartson (now Hogan Lovells) from 1997-2009, where she counseled online companies trade associations, and other corporations on privacy, consumer protection, and litigation matters, and represented them before government agencies on a wide range of antitrust, e-commerce, and privacy-related issues.

In 2009, Callahan was appointed by Secretary Janet Napolitano to serve as Chief Privacy Officer of the United States Department of Homeland Security.  During her tenure in that role, Callahan led department-wide programs on privacy protections and information sharing, led all privacy initiatives in the DHS cybersecurity arena, served as the Department's Chief Freedom of Information Act (FOIA) Officer, and represented DHS in extensive outreach and negotiations with privacy counterparts in the European Union, Canada and other countries to explain and support the U.S. privacy framework.

From 2012 to 2017, Callahan was a Partner at Jenner & Block, at which she founded and chaired the firm's Information Governance Practice. At Jenner, Callahan applied her unique and broad experience to advise an array of clients across a spectrum of industries on issues at the interface of privacy protection with cybersecurity and national security.

From 2017 to 2021, Callahan worked as an Assistant General Counsel for the Walt Disney Company.  At Disney, Callahan was a leader of the global Privacy-Legal team across all segments of the company's businesses and developed crucial and innovative privacy programs and frameworks to protect the company.

In 2021, Callahan returned to government work and to the Department of Homeland Security to work under DHS Deputy Secretary John Tien.

Personal life 
Callahan was married to longtime entertainment executive Tony Lynn, who died of esophageal cancer on December 1, 2018. Callahan met Lynn while representing Playboy Entertainment Group in United States v. Playboy Entertainment Group, Inc., a successful First Amendment challenge to the Telecommunications Act of 1996.

When not spending time with her family, Callahan devotes much of her free time volunteering for public service programs and initiatives that she is passionate about, most recently related to the COVID pandemic.

Awards and honors 
Callahan is a Truman Scholar, a national scholarship for public service.  She was awarded her scholarship for Pennsylvania in 1988.

In 2011 Callahan received the Federal Computer Week's Federal 100 Award for her work on privacy and cybersecurity. In October 2013, Mary Ellen received the Privacy Vanguard Award, given by the International Association of Privacy Professionals, an annual award honoring the privacy professional who has demonstrated outstanding leadership, knowledge and creativity in privacy and data protection.

Callahan was named a Best Lawyer by the Washingtonian magazine twice:  in 2013 in the field of National Security Law, and in 2015, Cybersecurity Law.  In 2013, she was named a Tech Titan by Washingtonian.

On April 6, 2022, Callahan was announced as the Commencement Speaker for the University of Pittsburgh Class of 2020 Commencement (rescheduled as a result of the COVID-19 pandemic).

References 

Living people
United States Department of Homeland Security officials
Year of birth missing (living people)
University of Pittsburgh alumni
University of Chicago Law School alumni